Roberton is a small village in the Scottish Borders area of Scotland, on the B711 and near to the A7,  from Hawick,  from Galashiels, and  from Langholm. It is situated by the Ale Water, the Alemoor Loch and the Borthwick Water, and nearby are Branxholme, Broadhaugh, Burnfoot and the Craik Forest.

Borders poet

The Borders poet Will H. Ogilvie (1869–1963) was born in Kelso and died in nearby Ashkirk.  A cairn has been erected in his memory. 
The hill road to Roberton's a steep road to climb, But where your foot has crushed it, you can smell the scented thyme, And if your heart's a Border heart, look down to Harden Glen, And hear the blue hills ringing with the restless hoofs again...

Unveiled in August 1993, an identical cairn was also erected in Bourke, New South Wales.  The bronze was prized from the surface and stolen in August 2016 for metal theft.  One of Ogilvie's 800+ poems included the six stanza The road to Roberton:

The hill road to Roberton: Ale Water at our feet,
And grey hills and blue hills that melt away and meet,
With cotton-flowers that wave to us and lone whaups that call,
And over all the Border mist – the soft mist over all.

When Scotland married England long, long ago,
The winds spun a wedding-veil of moonlight and snow,
A veil of filmy silver that sun and rain had kissed,
And she left it to the Border in a soft grey mist.

A replacement cairn was installed at Harden Glen on the anniversary of Ogilvie's 150th birthday, in August 2019.

Borthwick Mains Symbol Stone

 to the east of the village, in front of the house at Borthwick Mains, is a fish symbol-stone, possibly representing a salmon. It is similar to class 1 Pictish symbol stones of the 6th or 7th century, but its status is doubtful, and it may belong to a more recent period.

See also

List of places in the Scottish Borders
List of places in Scotland
List of Scottish writers

Notes

References
Brooke, CJ (2000) Safe sanctuaries: security and defence in Anglo-Scottish border churches 1290–1690, Edinburgh. Held at RCAHMS: F.5.31.BRO
THAS (1963) 'Sculptured stone found at Roberton'.

External links

RCAHMS record of Roberton (Roxburghshire), sometimes known as Kirk Borthwick Parish
Old Roads of Scotland: Craik Moor via Roberton to Hawick
Roberton Primary School, presently the oldest school in the Scottish Borders
GENUKI data on Roberton
Incident at Roberton Water Treatment Works
Flickr images of Hawick Common Riding, Roberton ride-out, 2009

Villages in the Scottish Borders
Parishes in Roxburghshire